Netherland (2008) is a novel by Joseph O'Neill. It concerns the life of a Dutchman living in New York in the wake of the September 11 attacks who takes up cricket and starts playing at the Staten Island Cricket Club.

Plot summary
Netherland opens on protagonist Hans van den Broek, a Dutch financial analyst living in London with his English wife Rachel, but quickly flashes back to the years Hans spent in New York City before and in the immediate aftermath of 9/11. At the beginning of the novel, Hans is preparing to return to Manhattan for the funeral of estranged friend Chuck Ramkissoon, who becomes the central figure of the novel. Chuck, a Trinidadian immigrant, guides Hans into and through the world of The Staten Island Cricket Club, most of whose members are also of West Indian or South Asian descent. Chuck is a charismatic idealist, running multiple (occasionally illegitimate) businesses, and making big, optimistic plans for the future. While Hans is swept along by Chuck’s magnetic ardor for the American dream, Rachel moves back to London under the pretense of safety for their young son and ideological indignation over the American fixation on economic oppression. Though Rachel is a markedly less likeable character than Chuck, Hans eventually, inevitably follows her back to London. He loses touch with his Trinidadian friend who is discovered, years later, simply a body, handcuffed and disposed of in the Gowanus Canal.

Publication and reviews
The writing of Netherland occupied O'Neill for seven years. When it was finished, O'Neill had great trouble in finding an agent. The book was turned down by every major US publisher, until it was accepted by Pantheon Books, a division of Random House. Chief executive Sonny Mehta was a cricket fan, and after reading Netherland, wrote a strong personal recommendation to booksellers.

Netherland was published in May 2008 and was featured on the cover of the New York Times Book Review where senior editor Dwight Garner  called it "the wittiest, angriest, most exacting and most desolate work of fiction we've yet had about life in New York and London after the World Trade Center fell". Later that year, the book was included in the New York Times Book Review list of "10 Best Books of 2008" as chosen by the paper's editors.

James Wood, writing in The New Yorker, called it "one of the most remarkable postcolonial books I have ever read". He wrote that it has been "consistently misread as a 9/11 novel, which stints what is most remarkable about it: that it is a postcolonial re-writing of The Great Gatsby." In an interview with the author published at the end of the Harper Perennial paperback edition, Joseph O'Neill remarks, "Clearly Netherland is having some sort of conversation with The Great Gatsby—saying goodbye to it perhaps, and to some of the notions associated with that wonderful book."

Awards and nominations
In the weeks leading up the announcement of the 2008 Man Booker Prize, Netherland was spoken of by some literary pundits as being the favourite to win. However, on 9 September 2008, the Booker nominee shortlist was announced and the novel, surprisingly at least for some critics at the New York Times, failed to make the list. The book was also nominated for the Warwick Prize for Writing (2008/9) and made it to the long list of that prize announced in November 2008.

Netherland won the 2009 PEN/Faulkner Award for Fiction, and the 2009 Kerry Group Irish Fiction Award.

On 12 April 2010, Netherland was announced as one of the 8 novels on the shortlist for the International Dublin Literary Award.

Translations
The punning title is untranslatable into Dutch, and the Dutch translation takes the title Laagland ("Lowland") rather than the more literal but ambiguous Nederland.

Notes

External links
 "Two Paths for the Novel", Zadie Smith review of Netherland from The New York Review of Books
  (Interview with Joseph O'Neill)
 BBC interview with Barack Obama praising the novel
 Netherland: 1st Obama Book Club Selection – A review of Obama's taste in reading, May, 2009.
 Review: Netherland – The New York Times
 Neitherlander – An Irishman's Difficulties with The Dutch Character Comments by a Dutchman
  (in development)

2008 Irish novels
Novels about cricket
Novels set in New York City
PEN/Faulkner Award for Fiction-winning works